Persian expedition or Persian campaign may refer to:

 Persian campaign (Alexander the Great) (334–333 BC)
Julian's Persian expedition (363)
 Persian expedition of Stepan Razin (1699)
 Persian campaign of Peter the Great (1722–1723)
 Persian expedition of 1796 of Catherine the Great
 Persian campaign (World War I) (1914–1918)

See also
 Anabasis (Xenophon), a written work, titled Persian Expedition in a well-known translation
List of wars involving Persia